The Secret of the Submarine is a 1915 American adventure film serial directed by George L. Sargent. It was 15 chapters and all of them are considered to be lost.

Plot

The heroes must keep the titular submarine from falling into the hands of the Russians or Japanese.

Cast
 Juanita Hansen as Cleo Burke.  This was Juanita Hansen's serial debut.
 Tom Chatterton as Lt. Jarvis Hope
 Hylda Hollis as Olga Ivanoff
 Lamar Johnstone as Gerald Morton
 George Clancey as Hook Barnacle
 William Tedmarsh as Tatsuma
 Harry Edmondson as Sextus
 George Webb as Mahlin
 Hugh Bennett as Dr. Ralph Burke
 Joseph Beaudry as Calvin Montgomery
 Perry Banks
 Leona Hutton
 George Gebhardt

Production
Secret of the submarine was written in the lead up to the United States' involvement in World War I by war correspondent Richard Barry. The serial was released 15 days after the Lusitania was torpedoed by a German sub.

See also
 List of film serials
 List of film serials by studio

References

External links

1915 films
1915 lost films
1915 adventure films
American silent serial films
American black-and-white films
American Film Company films
American adventure films
Lost American films
Submarine films
Lost adventure films
1910s American films
Silent adventure films
1910s English-language films